Ostiense Museum may refer to either of the following museums in Rome:

 Museo Archeologico Ostiense (Archaeological Museum of Ostia)
 Museo della Via Ostiense (Via Ostiense Museum) in the Porta San Paolo